John McMurrich (February 3, 1804 – February 13, 1883) was a businessman and political figure in Canada West and later Ontario.

He was born near Paisley, Scotland in 1804 and came to Upper Canada in 1833 to work in a York (Toronto) dry goods business affiliated with a Glasgow-based firm. He became a partner in 1837. McMurrich served on Toronto city council in 1860. He was elected to the Legislative Council of the Province of Canada in an 1862 by-election. He served on the Public School Board in Toronto for a number of years and was chairman from 1865 to 1867 and in 1870. In 1867, he was elected to the Legislative Assembly of Ontario for York North as a Liberal; he was defeated in 1871. He was a member of the Toronto Board of Trade and served as president for a number of Toronto companies. He died in Toronto in 1883.

His eldest son, William Barclay McMurrich, was a mayor of Toronto. His second son, George McMurrich, was a long-time alderman on Toronto City Council.  Another son, J. Playfair McMurrich, became a distinguished zoologist.

Legacy
McMurrich name bears on a few places in Ontario:

 McMurrich/Monteith is a municipality and census subdivision in Ontario named after McMurrich.
 McMurrich Street and McMurrich Junior Public School in Toronto are named in his honour.

References

External links

Biography at the Dictionary of Canadian Biography Online

1804 births
1883 deaths
Members of the Legislative Council of the Province of Canada
Ontario Liberal Party MPPs
People from Old Toronto
People from Renfrewshire
Scottish emigrants to pre-Confederation Ontario
Immigrants to Upper Canada